The Giraffes Show 07.25.09 is a concert film by the Brooklyn-based hard rock band, The Giraffes.  It was filmed at the Union Pool in Brooklyn, New York in July 2009. This is the band's first live release.

Show is sold by Crustacean Records as a Deluxe DVD+CD set.

Track listing DVD & CD

 "Smoke Machine"      
 "Done"
 "Prime Motivator"
 "Honest Men"
 "The Power of Fatherhood"
 "Medicaid Benefit Applique'"         
 "The Border"
 "The City"
 "The Kids"     
 "Sickness (This Is)
 "Having Fun"  
 "Sugarbomb"

DVD Bonus Features

 The Special Features That No One Watches
 Answers To Questions No One Gives A Shit About
 Million $ Man (Drunk Version)
 Alternate Ending

References

External links
 The Giraffes // Show DVD+CD at Crustacean Records
 THE GIRAFFES SHOW DVD TRAILER at Vimeo

The Giraffes (Brooklyn band) albums
Live video albums
2010 live albums
2010 video albums